Tombaatar is a mammal genus that existed during the Mongolian Upper Cretaceous period. It co-existed with some of the late dinosaurs. This animal was a member of the extinct order Multituberculata, within the suborder Cimolodonta and family Djadochtatheriidae. The genus Tombaatar was named by Rougier G.W., Novacek M. and Dashzeveg D. in 1997.

The species Tombaatar sabuli is known from remains found in the Upper Cretaceous Djadokhta Formation of Ukhaa Tolgod, Mongolia. Tombaatar was a relatively large multituberculate. The skull is about 6 cm in length.

References
 Rougier, Novacek & Dashzeveg (1997), "A new multituberculate from the late Cretaceous locality Ukhaa Tolgod, Mongolia: Considerations on multituberculate interrelationships", American Museum Novitates 3191, p. 1-26.
 Kielan-Jaworowska, Z. & Hurum, J.H. (2001), "Phylogeny and Systematics of multituberculate mammals", Paleontology 44, p. 389-429.
 Much of this information has been derived from  Mesozoic Mammals: Djadochtatherioidea, an Internet directory.

Cimolodonts
Cretaceous mammals
Extinct mammals of Asia
Prehistoric mammal genera